Bobby is a South Korean rapper, singer, songwriter, and member of K-pop band iKon, signed under 143 Entertainment. As of January 2023, the Korea Music Copyright Association has 93 songs registered under his name.

iKon albums/singles

Solo works

Other artists

Other works

Notes

References

Bobby (rapper), List of songs written by